Joseph Pecchia (13 July 1889 – 26 November 1974) was a French sports shooter. He competed in two events at the 1920 Summer Olympics.

References

External links
 

1889 births
1974 deaths
French male sport shooters
Olympic shooters of France
Shooters at the 1920 Summer Olympics
Sportspeople from Val-d'Oise